Hysterical is the third album by Clap Your Hands Say Yeah. It was released in September 2011.

History 
Clap Your Hands Say Yeah's album Hysterical was released on September 12, 2011, in Europe, Japan, and Australia, and September 20 in the United States by Wichita Recordings. The album was produced by John Congleton and features cover art designed by Maya Pindyck. It was the last album to feature long-time backing vocalist Robbie Guertin.

The band released "Same Mistake" and "Maniac" as singles for download from their website. A music video for "Maniac" made by Belgian director Pieter Dirkx was released on September 14, 2011.

Track listing 
All lyrics and music written by Alec Ounsworth.

 "Same Mistake"
 "Hysterical"
 "Misspent Youth"
 "Maniac"
 "Into Your Alien Arms"
 "In a Motel"
 "Yesterday, Never"
 "Idiot"
 "Siesta (For Snake)"
 "Ketamine and Ecstasy"
 "The Witness' Dull Surprise"
 "Adam's Plane"

References 

2011 albums
Clap Your Hands Say Yeah albums
Albums produced by John Congleton